René Alexandre (22 December 1885 – 19 August 1946) was a French actor.

René Alexandre was born in Reims and died in Vitré, Ille-et-Vilaine in 1946. He was married to actress Gabrielle Robinne from 1912 until his death.

Filmography (partial)
 Fouquet (1910) the man in the iron mask
 The Hunchback of Notre Dame (1911)
 The Lacquered Box (1932)
 A Man's Neck (1933)
 Paris-New York (1940) of Yves Mirande

1885 births
1946 deaths
French male stage actors
French male film actors
French male silent film actors
Sociétaires of the Comédie-Française
Actors from Reims
20th-century French male actors